is a major highway on the islands of Honshū and Kyūshū in Japan. It follows the old Sanyōdo westward from the city of Osaka, Osaka Prefecture in the Kansai region to the city of Kitakyūshū in Fukuoka Prefecture, passing through the San'yō region en route. Between Hyōgo Prefecture and Yamaguchi Prefecture it parallels the Sanyō Expressway; it crosses the Kanmon Straits through the Kanmon Roadway Tunnel. Its total length is 533.2 km. At its Osaka terminus, it meets Route 1; at its western terminus, it links with Routes 3 and 10.

Route data
Length: 533.2 km (331.4 mi)
Origin: Umeda, Kita-ku, Osaka (originates at the terminus of Routes 1, 25 and 176 and the origins of Routes 26, 163 and 165)
Terminus: Moji-ku, Kitakyushu (ends at the origins of Routes 3 and 10)
Major cities: Kobe, Himeji, Himeji, Okayama, Kurashiki, Fukuyama, Hiroshima, Iwakuni, Shimonoseki

History
4 December 1952 - First Class National Highway 2 (from Osaka to Kitakyushu)
1 April 1965 - General National Highway 2 (from Osaka to Kitakyushu)

Overlapping sections
From Nishinomiya (Fudabasuji intersection) to Kobe (San'nomiya-East intersection): Route 171
From Kobe (Higashi-Shiriike intersection) to Akashi (Kariguchi intersection): Route 28
From Kobe (Higashi-Shiriike intersection) to Akashi (Kokubo intersection): Route 250
From Himeji to Taishi Town (Taishi-Kamiota IC): Route 29

References

002
AH1
Roads in Fukuoka Prefecture
Roads in Hiroshima Prefecture
Roads in Hyōgo Prefecture
Roads in Okayama Prefecture
Roads in Osaka Prefecture
Roads in Yamaguchi Prefecture